St. Mary's Episcopal Church and Cemetery is a historic church and cemetery at 258 Concord Street, in the village of Newton Lower Falls, Newton, Massachusetts. St. Mary's Parish was formed in 1811. The church, built in 1813–14 and restyled in 1838, is the oldest church in Newton, and is a fine example of Gothic Revival/Federal style architecture. The cemetery, which dates from 1812, is the oldest non-government-owned cemetery in Newton. The property was listed on the National Register of Historic Places in 1980.

Architecture and history
St. Mary's Church is set just north of Washington Street (Massachusetts Route 16) between Concord and Grove Streets. It is a single-story wood-frame building, with a gable roof, clapboard siding, and a brick foundation. Its square tower rises above a gabled entry pavilion that projects from the center of the west-facing facade. The pavilion has two entrances, each flanked by pilasters and topped by a Gothic-arched transom. A central window placed high has a trefoil pattern. Most of the building's remaining windows are sash windows topped by half-round transoms. The tower rising above the pavilion begins with a square section with oculus windows on each side, topped by a smaller belfry with Gothic-arched louvers and a railing with pinnacled corner posts. These details are repeated at a smaller scale above the belfry. Notable features of the church interior are its original high box pews, choir loft and plain glass windows. The plain chancel was added in 1922.

In 1954 the tower was again rebuilt, removing Gothic features in a bid to return the church to a more Federal appearance. The land for the church was purchased by Samuel Brown, a wealthy Boston merchant who had established one of the paper mills in Newton Lower Falls, and he also donated funds toward the building's construction.

Current status
St. Mary's Episcopal Church serves Newton Lower Falls, Wellesley Hills across the Charles River and surrounding areas and is a parish in the Episcopal Diocese of Massachusetts. It holds two regular services on Sunday mornings and has a well-known choral music program. Its current rector is the Reverend Ann Bonner Stewart, succeeding the Reverend Doctor Paul Kolbet.

The cemetery is still in use as evidenced by a burial in 2018.

Notable burials in churchyard
 Josiah Gardner Abbott, 1814–1891, member of the United States House of Representatives from Massachusetts.
 Lewis Golding Arnold, 1817–1871, Civil War general.
 Sarah Fuller, 1836–1927, founder of the Horace Mann School for the Deaf and Hard of Hearing
 Zibeon Hooker, 1752–1840, Drummer at the Battle of Bunker Hill
 Horatio William Parker, 1863–1919, American composer.
 Charles Rice, 1787–1863, brigadier general in the Massachusetts Militia and Massachusetts state representative.

See also

 National Register of Historic Places listings in Newton, Massachusetts
 Beverly E. Hurney, Saint Mary's Cemetery Newton, Massachusetts: Epitaphs (Boston: New England Historic Genealogical Society, 2000).

References

External links
 St. Mary's website

National Register of Historic Places in Newton, Massachusetts
Churches completed in 1814
19th-century Episcopal church buildings
Churches on the National Register of Historic Places in Massachusetts
Episcopal church buildings in Massachusetts
Cemeteries on the National Register of Historic Places in Massachusetts
Cemeteries in Newton, Massachusetts
Churches in Newton, Massachusetts
Historic district contributing properties in Massachusetts